Max Beck (born 13 January 1952) is a Liechtensteiner luger. He competed in the men's singles and doubles events at the 1976 Winter Olympics.

References

1952 births
Living people
Liechtenstein male lugers
Olympic lugers of Liechtenstein
Lugers at the 1976 Winter Olympics
Place of birth missing (living people)